The Akademio de Esperanto (AdE) is an independent body of Esperanto speakers who steward the evolution of said language by keeping it consistent with the Fundamento de Esperanto in accordance with the Declaration of Boulogne. Modeled somewhat after the Académie française and the Real Academia Española, the Akademio was proposed by L. L. Zamenhof, the creator of Esperanto, at the first World Esperanto Congress, and was founded soon thereafter under the name Lingva Komitato (Language Committee). This Committee had a "superior commission" called the Akademio. In 1948, within the framework of a general reorganization, the Language Committee and the Academy combined to form the Akademio de Esperanto.

The Akademio consists of 45 members and has a president, vice presidents, and a secretary. The corresponding address including e-mail is at the secretary. It is funded by a subsidy from the Universal Esperanto Association and by donations.

Members 

Members are elected by their peers for a period of nine years, with elections being held every three years for a third of the members. Following the last elections in February 2022, the Akademio de Esperanto consists of the following members:

 Javier Alcalde
 Tatjana Auderskaja
 Bak Giwan
 Marc Bavant
 Hans Becklin
 Cyril Robert Brosch
 Duncan Charters
 Renato Corsetti
 Markos Kramer (Marcos Cramer)
 Probal Dasgupta
 Simon Davies
 Mariana Evlogieva
 Grant Goodall
 Edmund Grimley-Evans
 Nikolao Gudskov
 Maritza Gutiérrez González
 HIROTAKA Masaaki
 Jesper Lykke Jacobsen
 Ruth Kevess-Cohen
 Boris Kolker
 Erich-Dieter Krause
 Jouko Lindstedt
 Haitao LIU
 François Lo Jacomo
 Anna Löwenstein
 Vilhelmo Lutermano
 Ahmad Mamdoohi
 Mao Zifu
 Valentin Melnikov
 Georgi Mihalkov
 Lee Miller
 Carlo Minnaja
 Brian Moon
 Pavel Mozhaev (Paŭlo Moĵajev)
 Marc van Oostendorp
 Tim Owen
 Paul Peeraerts
 Barbara Pietrzak
 Fernando Pita
 Giridhar Rao
 Orlando E. Raola
 Nicola Ruggiero
 Alexander Shlafer
 Amri Wandel
 Bertilo Wennergren

Former members have included Gaston Waringhien, Rüdiger Eichholz, Jorge Camacho, Victor Sadler, Michel Duc-Goninaz, Lena Karpunina, and William Auld (president, 1979–1983).

See also 
 List of language regulators

References

External links 
 

Esperanto organizations
Academies
Language regulators